Nudaurelia is a genus of moths in the family Saturniidae first described by Rothschild in 1895.

Species
Nudaurelia aethiops Rothschild, 1907
Nudaurelia allardiana Rougeot, 1971
Nudaurelia alopia (Westwood, 1849)
Nudaurelia amathusia Weymer, 1909
Nudaurelia anna (Maassen & Weymer, 1885)
Nudaurelia antelata Darge, 2003
Nudaurelia anthina (Karsch, 1892)
Nudaurelia anthinoides Rougeot, 1978
Nudaurelia bamendana (Schultze, 1914)
Nudaurelia belayneshae Rougeot, 1978
Nudaurelia benguelensis (Oberthuer, 1921)
Nudaurelia bicolor Bouvier, 1930
Nudaurelia bouvieri (Le Moult, 1933)
Nudaurelia broschi Darge, 2002
Nudaurelia camerunensis Bouvier, 1930
Nudaurelia capdevillei Rougeot, 1979
Nudaurelia carnegiei Janse, 1918
Nudaurelia cleoris (Jordan, 1910)
Nudaurelia cytherea (Fabricius, 1775)
Nudaurelia dargei Bouyer, 2008
Nudaurelia dione (Fabricius, 1793)
Nudaurelia dionysae Rougeot, 1948
Nudaurelia eblis (Strecker, 1878)
Nudaurelia emini (Butler, 1888)
Nudaurelia fasciata Gaede, 1927
Nudaurelia flammeola Darge, 2002
Nudaurelia germaini Bouvier, 1926
Nudaurelia gschwandneri Rebel, 1917
Nudaurelia gueinzii (Staudinger, 1872)
Nudaurelia herbuloti Darge, 1992
Nudaurelia hurumai Darge, 2003
Nudaurelia jamesoni (Druce, 1890)
Nudaurelia kiliensis Darge, 2009
Nudaurelia kilumilorum Darge, 2002
Nudaurelia kohlli Darge, 2009
Nudaurelia krucki Hering, 1930
Nudaurelia latifasciata Sonthonnax, 1901
Nudaurelia lutea Bouvier, 1930
Nudaurelia macrops Rebel, 1917
Nudaurelia macrothyris (Rothschild, 1906)
Nudaurelia mariae Bouyer, 2007
Nudaurelia melanops (Bouvier, 1930)
Nudaurelia michaelae Darge, 1975
Nudaurelia mitfordi (Kirby, 1892)
Nudaurelia murphyi Darge, 1992
Nudaurelia myrtea Rebel, 1917
Nudaurelia perscitus Darge, 1992
Nudaurelia reducta (Rebel, 1917)
Nudaurelia renvazorum Darge, 2002
Nudaurelia rhodina (Rothschild, 1907)
Nudaurelia richelmanni Weymer, 1908
Nudaurelia rubra Bouvier, 1927
Nudaurelia rubricostalis Kirby, 1892
Nudaurelia staudingeri (Aurivillius, 1893)
Nudaurelia ungemachti Bouvier, 1926
Nudaurelia wahlbergi (Boisduval, 1847)
Nudaurelia wahlbergina Rougeot, 1972
Nudaurelia xanthomma Rothschild, 1907

References

Saturniinae